The First Constitutional Era of the Ottoman Empire was the period of constitutional monarchy from the promulgation of the Ottoman constitution of 1876 (meaning 'Basic Law' or 'Fundamental Law' in Ottoman Turkish), written by members of the Young Ottomans, that began on 23 December 1876 and lasted until 14 February 1878. These Young Ottomans were dissatisfied by the Tanzimat and instead pushed for a constitutional government similar to that in Europe. The constitutional period started with the dethroning of Sultan Abdulaziz. Abdul Hamid II took his place as Sultan. The era ended with the suspension of the Ottoman Parliament and the constitution by Sultan Abdul Hamid II, with which he restored his own absolute monarchy.

The first constitutional era did not include a party system. At the time, the Ottoman Parliament (known as the General Assembly of the Ottoman Empire) was seen as the voice of the people but not as a venue for the formation of political parties and organizations.

The elections for the Parliament were held in accordance with the provisional electoral regulations. The Parliament (General Assembly of the Ottoman Empire;) was composed in two stages. The lower house of the bicameral legislature was the Chamber of Deputies, while the upper house was the Senate. The initial selection of deputies was made by administrative councils in the provinces (also called ).

After the establishment of the General Assembly in the provinces, the members selected the deputies from within the assembly to form the Chamber of Deputies in the capital. The Chamber had 115 members and reflected the distribution of the millets in the empire. In the second elections, there were 69 Muslim millet representatives and 46 representatives of other millets (Jews, Phanariotes, Armenians).

The second body was the Senate, and the members were selected by the Sultan. The Senate had only 26 members. It was designed to replace the porte, and the Grand Vizier become the speaker of Senate.

The two elections happened between 1877 and 1878.

First term, 1877

The members' reactions to the approaching war were very strong, and Sultan Abdul Hamid II asked for new elections citing the Russo-Turkish War (1877–1878).

Second term, 1878

The life of the second term of the parliament was merely a few days, as after the initial speeches by the members from Balkan vilayets, 
Abdul Hamid II closed the parliament, citing social unrest.

The president of the Chamber of Deputies was a Deputy from Jerusalem, Yusif Dia Pasha Al Khalidi.

Significant people
 Mehmed Rushdi Pasha
 Ahmed Vefik Pasha
 Hussein Avni Pasha
 Midhat Pasha
 Suleiman Pasha

See also
 Second Constitutional Era
 Constitutional history of Turkey
 Elections in the Ottoman Empire
 The Ottomans: Europe's Muslim Emperors

References

Politics of the Ottoman Empire
1870s in the Ottoman Empire
Reform in the Ottoman Empire